

The Royal Aircraft Factory R.E.7 was a British two-seat light bomber and reconnaissance biplane designed by the Royal Aircraft Factory and built under contracts by the Coventry Ordnance Works, Austin, Napier and Siddeley-Deasy for the Royal Flying Corps.

Development
Developed from the R.E.5 the R.E.7 was designed to carry heavier loads and also suitable for escort and reconnaissance duties. It was an-unequal span biplane with a fixed tailskid landing gear and powered by a nose-mounted 120 hp (89 kW) Beardmore engine driving a four-bladed propeller. The aircraft was built by a number of different contractors with the first aircraft operational with the Royal Flying Corps in France in early 1916. The aircraft had two open cockpits with the observer/gunner in the forward cockpit under the upper wing and the pilot aft.

Operational history
It was soon found that the aircraft could not be used as an escort due to the limited field of fire for the single lewis gun but the R.E.7 had a useful payload and was soon used as a light bomber with the more powerful engine (either a 150 hp (112 kW) RAF 4a or 160 hp (119 kW) Beardmore). Over a quarter of the aircraft built were used in France in the middle of 1916 but their slow speed and low ceiling with a bomb load made them vulnerable to attack. The R.E.7s were withdrawn and used for training and a number were used as engine test beds. Use was made of them as target tugs trailing a sleeve drogue for air-to-air firing practice, probably one of the first aircraft to do this.

At least two R.E.7s were converted to three seaters.

Operator

Royal Flying Corps
No. 9 Squadron RFC
No. 12 Squadron RFC
No. 19 Squadron RFC
No. 20 Squadron RFC
No. 21 Squadron RFC
No. 37 Squadron RFC
No. 49 Squadron RFC

Specifications (light bomber)

See also

References

 

 RAF R.E.7 – British Aircraft Directory

1910s British bomber aircraft
RE07
Aircraft first flown in 1915